William Carroll may refer to:

William Carroll (Tennessee politician) (1788–1844), Major-general of Tennessee state militia, Battle of New Orleans (War of 1812); six-term Governor of Tennessee
William Carroll (Australian politician) (1872–1936), Australian Senator
William A. Carroll (1876–1928), American silent film actor
William D. Carroll (1880–1955), member of the Wisconsin State Senate, 1931–1935
William F. Carroll (1877–1964), lawyer, judge, and political figure in Nova Scotia, Canada
William Henry Carroll (1810–1868), Confederate general, American Civil War; son of Governor Carroll
William K. Carroll (born 1952), professor of sociology
William T. Carroll (1902–1992), American politician and Lieutenant Governor of Connecticut
William "Billy", Carroll (1960–1976), victim of serial killer John Wayne Gacy
Will Carroll (born 1970), author
Bill Carroll (broadcaster) (born 1959), Canadian broadcast personality
Bill Carroll (coach) (?–2009), pole vaulter and athletics coach at the University of Oklahoma
Bill Carroll (musician) (born 1966), American singer, songwriter, record producer, bassist and guitarist
Bill Carroll (rower), former New Zealand rower
Billy Carroll (born 1959), Canadian former ice hockey player